The 2015 European League of Legends Championship Series (2015 EU LCS) was the third season of the European League of Legends Championship Series. 

The Summer Split began with a rematch of the 2015 EU LCS Spring playoff finals between Unicorns of Love and fnatic. It was won by fnatic, their fifth split title. Most matches were played at a film studio in Adlershof, Berlin. The finals were played at the Hovet Arena Globentorget, Arenatorget in Johanneshov, Stockholm, Sweden.

Spring

Regular season

Summer

Rosters

Regular season

Playoffs

References

European League of Legends Championship
European League of Legends Championship Series seasons
European League of Legends Championship
European League of Legends Championship
2015 in Berlin